Günter Lüling (25 October 1928 – 10 September 2014) was a German Protestant theologian, philological scholar (Dr. in Arabistics and Islamics) and pioneer in the study of early Islamic origins. From 1962 to 1965 he was the Director of the German Goethe-Institut in Aleppo, Syria.

Thesis 
A student of Albert Schweitzer and Martin Werner (1887-1964), he attempted to demonstrate the textual link between pre-Islamic Christian hymnody in the Middle East and the composition of the Qur'an. He theorized that the early believers of what later became Orthodox Islam were one of the last communities sticking to a — what Lüling believed to be the true — non-Trinitarian Christian creed, for whom Jesus and the Holy Spirit were not divine. Their theological positions were adopted by later generations and evolved to become an  ethno-centric religion of Arabs — Islam (i.e. "religion of Abraham and the tribes"). He also proposed that the Meccan and Central Arabian adversaries of Muhammad, the "mushrikun", (the "associators" or those who "associate" other gods to God), were not polytheist pagans but Trinitarian Christians — the associates being Jesus and the Holy Spirit. In early post-prophetic times mushrikun was reinterpreted from its original meaning to become "idolators" or "pagans".

An example of what Lüling believes to be the underlying Christian hymn of the Quran is Quran 96 (Al-ʻAlaq), which Lüling believes was originally addressed to Christians not Muhammad. With his approach of research Lüling was an early representative of the "Saarbrücken School" which is part of the Revisionist School of Islamic Studies.

Dispute
According to Alan Dundes, in 1970 Luling submitted a doctoral dissertation  which suggested that the Quran "contained evidence of traces of poetic strophic" (i.e. verse-repeating or chorus form, .. a song structure in which all verses or stanzas of the text are sung to the same music, as opposed to "through-composed" where new music written for every stanza) texts. Dundes writes that Lüling's view was "not in accord with orthodox Islamic tradition", and by 1972, "he was officially dismissed" from the University of Erlangen, where he had submitted his thesis. A lawsuit filed to overturn the dismissal carried on for six years but "did not succeed in reversing the university's action". This original Doctoral thesis was subsequently published in a book which he could not get published in the west and eventually was published in India. The English translation is entitled "A Challenge to Islam for Reformation: The Rediscovery and reliable Reconstruction of a comprehensive pre-Islamic Christian Hymnal hidden in the Koran under earliest Islamic Reinterpretations" and was reissued in 2022 as "A Challenge to ISLAM for Reformation"

Bibliography 
 Kritisch-exegetische Untersuchung des Qur'antextes. Erlangen, 1970 (Thesis).
 Die Einzigartige Perle des Suwaid ben Abī Kāhil al-Yaškurī : zweiter Teil ; über die eindeutige Christlichkeit dieses in der vorislamischen Heidenzeit hochgerühmten Gedichtes. Erlangen: Lüling, 1973.
 Über den Ur-Qur'an. Ansätze zur Rekonstruktion vorislamischer christlicher Strophenlieder im Qur'an. Erlangen: Lüling, 1974.
 . (Translation and considerable reworking of the 2. German edition 1993 of Über den Ur-Koran, 1st ed. 1974.)
https://www.amazon.com/gp/product/8120819527
https://www.amazon.com/Challenge-ISLAM-Reformation-Gunter-Luling/dp/9393214085
 Über den Urkoran. Ansätze zu Rekonstruktion der vorislamisch-christlichen Strophenlieder im Koran. 3rd corr. ed. Erlangen: Lüling, 2004. 
 Zwei Aufsätze zur Religions- und Geistesgeschichte. (Contains: 1. Der vorgeschichtliche Sinn des Wortes "Metall". 2. Avicenna und seine buddhistische Herkunft.) Erlangen: Lüling, 1977.
 Der christliche Kult an der vorislamischen Kaaba als Problem der Islamwissenschaft und christlichen Theologie. Erlangen: Lüling, 1977.
 Die Wiederentdeckung des Propheten Muhammad: eine Kritik am "christlichen" Abendland. Erlangen: Lüling, 1981. 
 Das Passahlamm und die altarabische "Mutter der Blutrache", die Hyäne: d. Passahopfer als Initiationsritus zu Blutrache u. heiligem Krieg. In ZRGG 34/1982, S. 131 - 147; (Sonderdr. aus ZRGG 34/1982). 
 Sprache und archaisches Denken : neun Aufsätze zur Geistes- und Religionsgeschichte (Language and archaic thinking: nine essays on the history of ideas and religion). Erlangen: Lüling, 1985. 
 Der christliche Kult an der vorislamischen Kaaba als Problem der Islamwissenschaft und christlichen Theologie. 2nd corr. ed. Erlangen: Lüling, 1992. .
 Sprache und Archaisches Denken. Aufsätze zur Geistes- und Religionsgeschichte.  Erlangen: Lüling, 2005. 2nd enlarged ed.

Further reading

References

See also
Michael Cook
Patricia Crone
Gerd R. Puin
John Wansbrough

1928 births
2014 deaths
Linguists from Germany
20th-century German theologians
German Arabists
History of Quran scholars
21st-century German theologians